Yvon Collin (born 10 April 1944 in Montauban) is a former member of the Senate of France who served from 1988 to 2020. He represented the Tarn-et-Garonne department, and is a member of the Radical Party of the Left.

References
Page on the Senate website 

1944 births
Living people
People from Montauban
Politicians from Occitania (administrative region)
Radical Party of the Left politicians
French Senators of the Fifth Republic
Senators of Tarn-et-Garonne